This is a list of episodes for the television series Great Performances. It includes special episodes.

Episodes

New York Playhouse (1972–73) 

 Antigone (October 7, 1972)
 The Rimers of Eldritch (November 4, 1972)
 Theatre and Film '72 (December 16, 1972)

Season 1 (1973–74)

As Theatre in America 

 Enemies, from the Repertory Theater of Lincoln Center (January 23, 1974)
 June Moon (January 30, 1974)
 Cyrano de Bergerac, from the American Conservatory Theater (February 6, 1974)
 Antigone, from Playhouse New York (February 13, 1974)
 King Lear, from the New York Shakespeare Festival (February 20, 1974)
 In Fashion, from the Actors Theatre of Louisville (March 20, 1974)
 Feasting with Panthers by Adrian Hall and Richard Cumming, from Trinity Repertory Company (March 27, 1974)
 The Contractor by David Storey, from Chelsea Theater Center (April 10, 1974)
 The Widowing of Mrs. Holroyd, from Long Wharf Theater (May 8, 1974)
 A Touch of the Poet (May 15, 1974)
 Monkey, Monkey, Bottle of Beer, How Many Monkeys Have We Here?, from Cincinnati Playhouse in the Park (May 22, 1974)

Season 2 (1974–75) 

 Arthur Rubinstein: Chopin (October 16, 1974)
 Herbert von Karajan and the Berlin Philharmonic Orchestra (November 13, 1974)
 Solti Conducts Mendelssohn  (December 16, 1976)
 Bernstein at Tanglewood (December 25, 1974)
 Herbert von Karajan and the Berlin Philharmonic Orchestra play Beethoven's Ninth Symphony (December 31, 1974)
 Theater in America: Zalmen or the Madness of God by Elie Wiesel, from Arena Stage (January 8, 1975)
 Theater in America: The Seagull, from Williamstown Theatre Festival (January 29, 1975)
 Theater in America: Brother to Dragons, adapted from the poem by Robert Penn Warren by Adrian Hall and Ken Campbell, from Trinity Repertory Company (February 19, 1975)
 Theater in America: The Ceremony of Innocence (March 1, 1975)
 Theater in America: Forget‐Me‐Not Lane by Peter Nichols, from Long Wharf Theater (March 12, 1975)
 Pagliacci, from La Scala (March 19, 1975)
 Theater in America: The School for Scandal, from the Guthrie Theater (April 2, 1975)
 Theater in America: The Rules of the Game, from the New Phoenix Repertory Company (April 30, 1975)
 Who's Happy Now? by Oliver Hailey

Season 3 (1975–76) 

 Jennie: Lady Randolph Churchill
 The Collection, from Laurence Olivier Presents (January 1, 1976)
 Theater in America: Beyond the Horizon, from the McCarter Theatre (January 14, 1976)
 Dance in America: Joffrey Ballet (January 21, 1976)
 Theater in America: First Breeze of Summer by Leslie Lee, from the Negro Ensemble Company (January 28, 1976)
 Theater in America: The Mound Builders by Lanford Wilson, from the Circle Repertory Company (February 11, 1976)
 Dance in America: Twyla Tharp & Dancers (February 25, 1976)
 Theater in America: The Time of Your Life, from The Acting Company
 Theater in America: All Over, from the Hartford Stage
 Dance in America: Martha Graham Dance Company (April 7, 1976)
 Theater in America: Who's Happy Now, from the Mark Taper Forum
 Theater in America: The Year of the Dragon, from The American Place Theatre
 Dance in America: Pennsylvania Ballet
 Dance in America: Martha Graham
 Dance in America: Dance Company
 Theater in America: The Patriots, from Asolo Theatre Company (May 26, 1976)
 Theater in America: The Eccentricities of a Nightingale, with the Old Globe Theater (June 16, 1976)

Season 4 (1976–77) 

 Theater in America: Ah! Wilderness (October 12, 1976)
 Fine Music Specials: Madama Butterfly (October 20, 1976)
 Theater in America: The Taming of the Shrew, from the American Repertory Theater (November 10, 1976)
 Solti Conducts Mendelssohn (December 15, 1976)
 Chester Mystery Plays (December 22, 1976)
 Secret Service by William Gillette, from the Phoenix Theatre (January 12, 1977)
 Arthur Rubinstein at 90 (January 26, 1977)
 episode featuring Mstislav Rostropovich (March 30, 1977)
 Theater in America: The Prince of Homburg from the Chelsea Theater Center (April 27, 1977)
 Dance in America: Pilobolus Dance Theater (May 4, 1977)
 Hard Times (starting May 11, 1977)
 Theater in America: End of Summer by S. N. Behrman, from the Charles MacArthur Center for American Theater (June 15, 1977)
 Abide with Me

Season 5 (1977–78) 

 The Royal Family (November 9, 1977)
 Verna: USO Girl (January 25, 1978)
 Count Dracula (March 1, 1978)
 Uncommon Women and Others (May 24, 1978)

Season 6 (1978–79) 
 Out of Our Father's House (August 2, 1978)
 The Good Doctor (November 8, 1978)
 Mourning Becomes Electra (December 6, 1978 to January 3, 1979)
 Theater in America: When Hell Freezes Over, I'll Skate, conceived by Vinnette Justine Carroll with music by Cleavant Derricks and Clinton Derricks-Carroll, from the Urban Arts Corps

Season 7 (1979–1980) 

 Musical Comedy Tonight (October 1, 1979)
 The Five Forty-Eight (November 7, 1979)
 The Most Happy Fella (March 5, 1980)
 Samuel Beckett's Happy Days (June 25, 1980)

Season 8 (1980–81) 

 Life on the Mississippi (November 24, 1980)
 Beverly! Her Farewell Performance (January 5, 1981)
 Great Performances at the Met: "L'Elisir D'Amore" (March 2, 1981)
 Rhapsody and Song – A Tribute to George Gershwin (May 9, 1981)
 The Girls in their Summer Dresses and Other Stories (June 1, 1981)

Season 9 (1981–82) 

 Norma (September 20, 1981)
 La Clemenza di Tito (October 19, 1981)
 The House of Mirth (November 2, 1981)
 Summer (November 9, 1981)
 Edith Wharton: Looking Back (November 16, 1981)
 Brideshead Revisited (January 18, 1982)

Season 10 (1982–83) 

 Great Performances' 10th Anniversary Celebration (December 6, 1982)
 The Regard of Flight by Bill Irwin (February 7, 1983)
 Ellington: The Music Lives On (March 7, 1983)
 The Innocents Abroad (May 9, 1983)
 Festival! Spoleto USA (June 27, 1983)

Season 11 (1983–84) 

 Princess Grace Remembered (September 26, 1983)
 Alice in Wonderland (October 3, 1983)
 Callas: An International Celebration (December 11, 1983)
 An American Christmas (December 19, 1983)
 The Magic Flute (January 9, 1984)
 La Cenerentola (February 6, 1984)
 Choreographer's Notebook: Stravinsky Piano Ballets by Peter Martins (February 13, 1984)
 The Soldier's Tale, directed by R. O. Blechman (March 19, 1984)

Season 12 (1984–85) 

 Dance in America: Baryshnikov by Tharp (October 5, 1984)
 The Dining Room (October 19, 1984)
 You Can't Take It With You (November 21, 1984)
 Lena Horne: The Lady and Her Music (December 7, 1984)
 From Vienna: The New Year's Celebration 1985 hosted by Walter Cronkite (January 1, 1985)
 Dance Black America, directed by D. A. Pennebaker and Chris Hegedus (January 25, 1985)
 Judy Garland: The Concert Years (March 22, 1985)
 Heartbreak House (April 24, 1985)
 Sweeney Todd: The Demon Barber of Fleet Street (May 3, 1985)
 Taking My Turn (May 10, 1985)
 The Best of Broadway (May 24, 1985)
 Orpheus (June 7, 1985)
 Ulysses (June 14, 1985)
 The Coronation of Poppea (June 21, 1985)

Season 13 (1985–86) 

 Doctor Fischer of Geneva (October 11, 1985)
 Three by Three (October 18, 1985)
 Laurence Olivier—A Life (October 25–31, 1985)
 The Gospel at Colonus (November 8, 1985)
 Master Harold...and the Boys (November 15, 1985)
 Sylvia Fine Kaye's Musical Comedy Tonight III (The Spark and the Glue) (November 22, 1985)
 The Importance of Being Earnest (November 29, 1985)
 San Francisco Ballet in Cinderella (December 7, 1985)
 Falstaff (December 13, 1985)
 Rossini at Versailles (December 27, 1985)
 From Vienna: The New Year's Celebration 1986 hosted by Walter Cronkite (January 1, 1986)
 On the Razzle (January 3, 1986)
 (January 14, 1986)
 Heartbreak House (January 24, 1986)
 Einstein on the Beach: The Changing Image of Opera (January 31, 1986)
 The Cotton Club Remembered (February 7, 1986)
 Irving Berlin's America (March 7, 1986)
 Follies in Concert (March 14, 1986)
 Cavalleria Rusticana (March 21, 1986)
 Bernstein Conducts Haydn's Mass in Time of War (March 28, 1986)
 Elektra (April 11, 1986)
 Early Days (April 18, 1986)
 Dance in America: Choreography by Jerome Robbins with the New York City Ballet (May 2, 1986)
 Grown Ups by Jules Feiffer (May 9, 1986)
 Boxes: With the Sydney Dance Company (May 16, 1986)
 Bernstein on Brahms: Reflections and Performance (May 23, 1986)

Season 14 (1986–87) 

 (September 15, 1986)
 Miles Ahead: The Music of Miles Davis (October 17, 1986)
 Gian Carlo Menotti: The Musical Magician (November 21, 1986)
 Goya, by Gian Carlo Menotti (November 28, 1986)
 (December 16, 1986)
 From Vienna: The New Year's Celebration 1987 hosted by Walter Cronkite (January 1, 1987)
 The Silents: The Thief of Bagdad (January 9, 1987)
 In Memory Of... (January 16, 1987)
 (January 21, 1987)
 Monsignor Quixote (February 13, 1987)
 James Stewart: A Wonderful Life (March 13, 1987)
 Broadway Sings the Music of Jule Styne (March 20, 1987)
 Ozawa, directed by Albert and David Maysles (March 27, 1987)
 The Comedy of Errors (April 1, 1987)
 Steve Reich: A New Musical Language (April 10, 1987)
 Seize the Day (May 1, 1987)
 Vladimir Horowitz: The Last Romantic, directed by Albert and David Maysles (May 22, 1987)

Season 15 (1987–88) 

 The Music Makers: An ASCAP Celebration of American Music at Wolf Trap
 Tales from the Hollywood Hills: Natica Jackson (November 6, 1987)
 Tales from the Hollywood Hills: A Table at Ciro's (November 13, 1987)
 Tales from the Hollywood Hills: Pat Hobby Teamed with Genius (November 20, 1987)
 Celebrating Gershwin (November 27 and December 4, 1987)
 Christmas with Flicka (December 18, 1987)
 From Vienna: The New Year's Celebration 1988 hosted by Walter Cronkite (January 1, 1988)
 Toscanini: The Maestro (January 8, 1988)
 Wolf Trap Salutes Dizzy Gillespie: A Tribute to the Jazz Master (February 26, 1988)
 Bacall on Bogart (March 11, 1988)
 Nixon in China (April 15, 1988)
 The Silents: Our Hospitality (May 13, 1988)

Season 16 (1988–89) 

 Tales from the Hollywood Hills: The Old Reliable (November 4, 1988)
 Tales from the Hollywood Hills: The Golden Land (November 11, 1988)
 Tales from the Hollywood Hills: The Closed Set (November 18, 1988)
 The Silents: The Eagle (November 25, 1988)
 From Vienna: The New Year's Celebration 1989 hosted by Walter Cronkite (January 1, 1989)[8]
 Wynton Marsalis Blues and Swing (February 24, 1989)
 Canciones de Mi Padre (March 3, 1989)
 Bernstein at 70 (March 19, 1989)
 The New Moon (April 7, 1989)
 The Philadelphia Orchestra at Wolf Trap (May 26, 1989)
 The Aspern Papers (June 9, 1989)
 Tap Dance in America

Season 17 (1989–1990) 

 Show Boat (October 27, 1989)
 Our Town (November 2, 1989)
 An Evening with Alan Jay Lerner (November 24, 1989)
 L'Africaine, from the San Francisco Opera (December 15, 1989)
 Michael Tilson Thomas Conducts Miami's New World Orchestra (December 29, 1989)
 From Vienna: The New Year's Celebration 1990 hosted by Walter Cronkite (January 1, 1990)
 The Silents: Broken Blossoms (January 26, 1990)
 Music by Richard Rodgers (March 8, 1990)
 Solti's Beethoven: The Fifth Symphony Revisited (March 23, 1990)
 Largo desolato, from the Wilma Theater (April 20, 1990)
 The Orchestra, directed by Zbigniew Rybczyński (April 27, 1990)

Season 18 (1990–91) 

 Spike & Co.: Do It Acapella
 Swinging Out Live
 From Vienna: The New Year's Celebration 1991 hosted by Walter Cronkite (January 1, 1991)
 The Colored Museum
 The Fred Astaire Songbook
 A Masked Ball

Season 19 (1991–92) 

 Dance in America: Everybody Dance Now
 Paul McCartney's Liverpool Oratorio
 La Pastorela: The Sheperd's Tale
 Pavarotti and the Italian Tenor
 From Vienna: The New Year's Celebration 1992 hosted by Walter Cronkite (January 1, 1992)
 Unforgettable... with Love (March 7, 1992)
 The Lost Language of Cranes (June 24, 1992)

Season 20 (1992–93) 

 Jammin': Jelly Roll Morton on Broadway
 The Common Pursuit
 Guys and Dolls off the Record
 Placido Domingo: The Concert for Planet Earth
 José Carreras, Diana Ross and Placido Domingo: Christmas in Vienna
 The Hard Nut
 The Symphony of Rhythm: Solti Conducts Beethoven's Seventh
 Tosca From Rome
 From Vienna: The New Year's Celebration 1993 hosted by Walter Cronkite (January 1, 1993)
 Suddenly Last Summer
 Black and Blue
 Miles Davis: A Tribute
 Sondheim: A Celebration at Carnegie Hall
 John Barry's Moviola
 Nureyev
 Oedipus rex
 The Real McTeague: A Synthesis of Forms
 In the Wings: Angels in America on Broadway
 Lean by Jarre

Season 21 (1993–94) 

 The Maestros of Philadelphia
 The Sorceress
 Passing the Baton
 Pete Townshend's PsychoDerelict (December 1, 1993)
 On the Town in Concert
 Leonard Bernstein: The Gift of Music
 From Vienna: The New Year's Celebration 1994 hosted by Walter Cronkite (January 1, 1994)
 Turandot
 Jerry Herman's Broadway at the Bowl!
 Vladimir Horowitz: A Reminiscence
 Quartet
 The Songs of Six Families
 Carnegie Hall Salutes the Jazz Masters
 La Bohéme
 El Gato Montes

Season 22 (1994–95) 

 Carnegie Hall Opening Night 1994
 The Dangerous Liaisons
 Paddy Chayefsky's `The Mother'
 The World of Jim Henson
 Natalie Cole's Untraditional Traditional Christmas
 From Vienna: The New Year's Celebration 1995 hosted by Walter Cronkite (January 1, 1995)
 The Music of Kurt Weill: September Songs
 Some Enchanted Evening: Celebrating Oscar Hammerstein II
 Talking With...
 Legendary Maestros: The Art of Conducting

Season 23 (1995–96) 

 Carnegie Hall Opening Night 1995
 Music for the Movies: The Hollywood Sound
 Itzhak Perlman: In the Fiddler's House
 Pavarotti: My World
 Julie Andrews: Back on Broadway
 The Sleeping Beauty
 From Vienna: The New Year's Celebration 1996 hosted by Walter Cronkite (January 1, 1996)
 The Rake's Progress
 Les Misérables in Concert (March 1, 1996)
 Peter, Paul & Mary: Lifelines
 La Cenerentola
 Divas!

Season 24 (1996–97) 

 Carnegie Hall Opening Night 1996
 Dance in America: The Wrecker's Ball—Three Dances by Paul Taylor
 Dido and Aeneas
 Musicals Great Musicals: The Arthur Freed Unit at MGM
 Bobby McFerrin: Loosely Mozart: The New Innovators of Classical Music
 From Vienna: The New Year's Celebration 1997 hosted by Walter Cronkite (January 1, 1997)
 Thomas Hampson: I Hear America Singing
 Robert Altman's Jazz '34
 The Story of Gospel Music
 Ira Gershwin at 100: A Celebration at Carnegie Hall
 Emmeline
 Burt Bacharach: This Is Now

Season 25 (1997–98) 

 Carnegie Hall Opening Night 1997
 Henry V at Shakespeare's Globe
 The Music of Kander and Ebb: Razzle Dazzle
 San Francisco Opera Gala Celebration
 The College of Comedy With Alan King
 From Vienna: The New Year's Celebration 1998 hosted by Walter Cronkite (January 1, 1998)
 Creating Ragtime
 Porgy & Bess: An American Voice
 The New Jersey Performing Arts Center Opening Night Gala
 Frank Sinatra: The Very Good Years
 The Art of Singing: Golden Voices, Silver Screen
 Dance In America: Variety and Virtuosity: American Ballet Theatre Now
 Swan Lake
 Sam Shepard's True West
 Sam Shepard: Stalking Himself
 The Elixir of Love

Season 26 (1998–99) 

 Carnegie Hall Opening Night 1998
 Zizi: Je T'Aime
 Cats
 Pavarotti & Friends
 "A Streetcar Named Desire" from the San Francisco Opera
 From Vienna: The New Year's Celebration 1999 hosted by Walter Cronkite (January 1, 1999)
 The Rodgers & Hart Story: Thou Swell, Thou Witty
 The Noël Coward Story
 Star Crossed Lovers
 Swingin' with Duke: The Lincoln Center Jazz Orchestra with Wynton Marsalis
 Turandot at the Forbidden City
 The Making Of: Turandot at the Forbidden City
 Parsifal: The Search for the Grail

Season 27 (1999–2000) 

 Carnegie Hall Opening Night 1999
 Crazy for You
 Burn the Floor
 My Favorite Broadway: The Leading Ladies
 Andrea Bocelli: Sacred Arias
 Dance in America: Le Corsaire with American Ballet Theatre
 From Vienna: The New Year's Celebration 2000 hosted by Walter Cronkite (January 1, 2000)
 Central Park
 Aida's Brothers and Sisters: Black Voices in Opera
 Joseph and the Amazing Technicolor Dreamcoat
 College of Comedy with Alan King, Part II
 Berlin Philharmonic Europakonzert: Ode to Joy 2000
 The Art of Piano
 Play On!
 La Forza del Destino
 Can't Stop Now, a documentary on Nederlands Dans Theater III
 'La Traviata' from Paris
 Berlin Philharmonic Europakonzert: From Krakow

Season 28 (2000–01) 

 Carnegie Hall Opening Night 2000
 Chuck Jones: Extremes and In-Betweens, A Life in Animation
 Paul Simon: You're the One---In Concert from Paris
 From Mao to Mozart: Then and Now
 From Vienna: The New Year's Celebration 2001 hosted by Walter Cronkite (January 1, 2001)
 Copland's America
 The College of Comedy with Alan King III
 My Favorite Broadway: The Love Songs
 Elizabeth Taylor: England's Other Elizabeth
 Don Giovanni Unmasked
 Jesus Christ Superstar
 Don Quixote
 Dance in America: Free to Dance
 Three Mo' Tenors in Concert
 Recording `The Producers': A Musical Romp with Mel Brooks
 `Little Women' from Houston Grand Opera

Season 29 (2001–02) 

 Recording 'The Producers': A Musical Romp with Mel Brooks
 'Little Women' from Houston Grand Opera
 Dance in America: Holo Mai Pele
 Joshua Bell: West Side Story Suite From Central Park
 Alessandro Safina in Concert: Only You
 Wheel of Life
 The Art of Violin
 'The Nutcracker' from the Royal Ballet
 From Vienna: The New Year's Celebration 2002 hosted by Walter Cronkite (January 1, 2002)
 Dance in America: From Broadway: Fosse
 Kurosawa
 The Queen's Jubilee Gala: Live from Buckingham Palace
 Romeo and Juliet
 Berlin Philharmonic Europakonzert: From Istanbul

Season 30 (2002–03) 

 (September 24, 2002)
 Making 'The Misfits'
 Carnegie Hall Opening Night 2002
 Natalie Cole: Ask a Woman Who Knows
 Josh Groban in Concert
 'The Merry Widow' from the San Francisco Opera (December 25, 2002)
 From Vienna: The New Year's Celebration 2002 hosted by Walter Cronkite (January 1, 2003)
 (January 21, 2003)
 Dance in America: Born to Be Wild
 Kiss Me, Kate
 The Great American Songbook
 Renee Fleming and Bryn Terfel: Music Under the Stars
 (March 25, 2003)
 (April 8, 2003)
 30th Anniversary: A Celebration in Song
 Duetto: The Concert at the Roman Colosseum
 Dance in America: Lar Lubovitch's 'Othello'
 The Three Pickers: Legends of American Music
 Elton John at the Royal Opera House
 Berlin Philharmonic Europakonzert: From Palermo

Season 31 (2003–04) 

 The Los Angeles Philharmonic Inaugurates Walt Disney Concert Hall (October 29, 2003)
 Rodgers & Hammerstein's 'Oklahoma!'
 Berlin Philharmonic Europakonzert: From Lisbon (December 10, 2003)
 From Vienna: The New Year's Celebration 2004 hosted by Walter Cronkite (January 1, 2004)
 Degas and the Dance
 Dance in America: Acts of Ardor: Two Dances by Paul Taylor (January 28, 2004)
 (February 10, 2004)
 Harry Connick Jr.: Only You (March 1, 2004)
 Concert for George
 Dance in America: 'The Dream' with American Ballet Theatre
 Tchaikovsky Symphony No. 4 in Performance: The San Francisco Symphony and Michael Tilson Thomas
 Keeping Score: MTT on Music: The Making of a Performance, Tchaikovsky's 4th Symphony
 All-Star Piano Extravaganza: The Verbier Festival Concert
 From the Acropolis: A Salute to the Games with the Berlin Philharmonic

Season 32 (2004–05) 

 John Lennon's Jukebox
 Carnegie Hall Opening Night 2004
 Eric Clapton: Crossroads Guitar Festival
 Josh Groban: Live at the Greek
 Hayley Westenra in Concert
 Rodgers and Hammerstein's Cinderella
 Bill Irwin: Clown Prince
 From Vienna: The New Year's Celebration 2005 hosted by Walter Cronkite (January 1, 2005)
 Leonard Bernstein's 'Candide' with the New York Philharmonic
 Andrea Bocelli: Tribute on Ice
 One Night with Rod Stewart
 The Little Prince
 Operatunity
 Dance in America: 'Swan Lake' with American Ballet Theatre
 Cook, Dixon & Young in Concert
 From Shtetl to Swing

Season 33 (2005–06) 

 Renee Fleming: Sacred Songs and Carols
 Cream Reunion Concert
 Michael Bublé: Caught in the Act
 My Name Is Barbra
 The Nightingale
 From Vienna: The New Year's Celebration 2006 hosted by Walter Cronkite (January 1, 2006)
 Paul McCartney: Chaos and Creation at Abbey Road
 Andrea Bocelli: Amore Under the Desert Sky
 'South Pacific' in Concert from Carnegie Hall
 Dance in America: Beyond the Steps---Alvin Ailey American Dance Theater
 Garrison Keillor's Independence Day Special: A Prairie Home Companion at Tanglewood
 Bruce Springsteen: The Seeger Sessions Live at St. Luke's
 Vittorio: Dreams of Rome
 Dance in America: 'Jewels' from the Paris Opera Ballet
 The Vienna State Opera: 50th Anniversary Reopening Concert
 Mozart at 250: The Salzburg Festival Celebration

Season 34 (2006–07) 

 Carnegie Hall Opening Night 2006
 A Tribute to James Taylor
 Beverly Sills: Made in America
 Garrison Keillor's New Year's Eve Special
 From Vienna: The New Year's Celebration 2007 hosted by Walter Cronkite (January 1, 2007)
 Sting: Songs From the Labyrinth
 Jerry Lee Lewis: Last Man Standing
 Loreena McKennitt: Nights From the Alhambra
 Barenboim on Beethoven
 We Love Ella! A Tribute to the First Lady of Song
 Dance in America: Dancing in the Light
 Respect Yourself: The Stax Records Story
 Lionel Richie: Live in Paris
 Nureyev: The Russian Years

Season 35 (2007–08) 

 The Israel Philharmonic 70th Anniversary Gala Concert
 Eric Clapton Crossroads Guitar Festival Chicago
 Vivere: Andrea Bocelli Live in Tuscany
 Great Performances at the Met: Viewers' Choice
 'Rise and Fall of the City of Mahagonny' From LA Opera
 From Vienna: The New Year's Celebration 2008 hosted by Walter Cronkite (January 1, 2008)
 Carnegie Hall Celebrates Berlin
 Company
 The New York Philharmonic Live From North Korea
 Martina McBride: Live in Concert
 James Taylor: One Man Band
 Peter & the Wolf
 Dance in America: Wolf Trap's Face of America
 Primo
 Maestro: Portrait of Valery Gergiev

Season 36 (2008–09) 

 Pavarotti: A Life in Seven Arias
 Carnegie Hall Opening Night 2008: A Celebration of Leonard Bernstein
 Hitman: David Foster and Friends
 Domingo, Netrebko & Villazon: Three Stars in Vienna
 Dance in America: San Francisco Ballet's `Nutcracker'
 Doctor Atomic Great Performances Live from the Met (December 2008)
 From Vienna: The New Year's Celebration 2009 hosted by Julie Andrews (January 1, 2009)
 Cyrano de Bergerac
 The Police: Certifiable
 King Lear
 'In the Heights': Chasing Broadway Dreams (May 27, 2009 and November 10, 2017)
 Eric Clapton and Steve Winwood:Live from Madison Square Garden (May 30, 2009)
 Stevie Wonder: Live at Last
 'Chess' in Concert
 Pete Seeger's 90th Birthday Celebration From Madison Square Garden

Season 37 (2009–2010) 

 Harlem in Montmartre
 Karajan or Beauty As I See It
 Vienna Philharmonic Summer Concert 2009
 Gustavo Dudamel and the Los Angeles Philharmonic: The Inaugural Concert
 Sting: A Winter's Tale
 Andrea Bocelli & David Foster: My Christmas
 La Bohème
 From Vienna: The New Year's Celebration 2010 hosted by Julie Andrews (January 1, 2010)
 Passing Strange
 Michael Bublé Meets Madison Square Garden
 Dance in America: 'NY Export: Opus Jazz'
 Hamlet
 La Danse
 Vienna Philharmonic Summer Night Concert 2010
 Renée Fleming & Dmitri Hvorostovsky: A Musical Odyssey in St. Petersburg
 Macbeth

Season 38 (2010–11) 

 Chicago Symphony Orchestra: Pierre Boulez Conducts Mahler's 7th
 Sondheim! The Birthday Concert
 Celebracion: Gustavo Dudamel and the L.A. Phil With Juan Diego Florez
 From Vienna: The New Year's Celebration 2011 hosted by Paula Zahn (January 1, 2011)
 Harry Connick, Jr. In Concert on Broadway
 Hitman Returns: David Foster & Friends
 Billy Joel: Live at Shea Stadium
 Jackie Evancho: Dream With Me in Concert
 Carnegie Hall 120th Anniversary Concert
 Eric Clapton Crossroads Guitar Festival 3
 Rigoletto From Mantua
 Vienna Philharmonic Summer Night 2011
 A Concert for New York
 Placido Domingo: My Favorite Roles

Season 39 (2011–12) 

 Hugh Laurie: Let Them Talk...A Celebration of New Orleans Blues
 Miami City Ballet Dances Balanchine and Tharp
 Il Postino From LA Opera
 Andrea Bocelli Live in Central Park
 The Little Mermaid From San Francisco Ballet
 From Vienna: The New Year's Celebration 2012 hosted by Julie Andrews (January 1, 2012)
 Herbie Hancock, Gustavo Dudamel and the Los Angeles Philharmonic Celebrate Gershwin
 Let Me Down Easy by Anna Deavere Smith
 Tony Bennett Duets II
 Memphis
 The Phantom of the Opera at Royal Albert Hall
 The Thomashefskys: Music and Memories of a Life in the Yiddish Theater
 San Francisco Symphony at 100
 Twilight: Los Angeles
 Tanglewood 75th Anniversary Celebration
 Jackie Evancho: Music of the Movies
 Vienna Philharmonic Summer Night Concert 2012

Season 40 (2012–13) 

 Paul McCartney's Live Kisses
 Great Performances at the Met: Wagner's Ring Cycle (September 11–14, 2012)
 Rod Stewart: Merry Christmas, Baby
 Magical Mystery Tour Revisited
 The Beatles' Magical Mystery Tour
 From Vienna: The New Year's Celebration 2013 hosted by Julie Andrews (January 1, 2013)
 Broadway Musicals: A Jewish Legacy
 Paul Simon's Graceland Journey
 Great Performances at the Met: L'Elisir d'Amore
 Great Performances at the Met: Otello
 Andrea Bocelli: Love In Portofino
 Great Performances at the Met: The Tempest
 Paul Taylor Dance Company in Paris
 Great Performances at the Met: La Clemenza di Tito
 Great Performances at the Met: Un Ballo in Maschera
 Great Performances at the Met: Rigoletto
 Great Performances at the Met: Aida
 Great Performances at the Met: Les Troyens
 Great Performances at the Met: Francesca da Rimini
 Great Performances at the Met: Giulio Cesare
 Dancing at Jacob's Pillow: Never Stand Still
 Vienna Philharmonic Summer Night Concert 2013

Season 41 (2013–14) 

 The Hollow Crown: Richard II
 The Hollow Crown: Henry IV, Part 1
 The Hollow Crown: Henry IV, Part 2
 The Hollow Crown: Henry V
 Great Performances' 40th Anniversary Celebration
 Moby-Dick From San Francisco Opera
 Stephen Sondheim's 'Company' With the New York Philharmonic
 Barbra Steisand: Back to Brooklyn
 Pavarotti: A Voice for the Ages
 From Vienna: The New Year's Celebration 2014 hosted by Julie Andrews (January 1, 2014)
 Great Performances at the Met: Eugene Onegin
 Barrymore
 National Theatre: 50 Years on Stage
 Sting: The Last Ship
 Donald Fagen, Michael McDonald, Boz Scaggs: The Dukes of September
 Steve Martin and the Steep Canyon Rangers Featuring Edie Brickell in Concert
 Bob Dylan: The 30th Anniversary Concert Celebration
 The Dave Clark Five: Glad All Over, A Great Performances Special
 Matthew Bourne's Sleeping Beauty

Season 42 (2014–15) 

 Dudamel Conducts the Verdi Requiem at the Hollywood Bowl
 Vienna Philharmonic Summer Night Concert 2014
 Rejoice With Itzhak Perlman
 Star-Spangled Spectacular: The Bicentennial of Our National Anthem
 Tony Bennett and Lady Gaga: Cheek to Cheek Live!
 Cats
 Encore! Great Performances at the Met
 From Vienna: The New Year's Celebration 2015 hosted by Julie Andrews (January 1, 2015)
 American Voices With Renée Fleming
 La Dolce Vita: The Music of Italian Cinema
 Bryan Adams in Concert
 Mark Morris Dance Group: L'Allegro
 Annie Lennox: Nostalgia Live in Concert
 Boston Symphony Orchestra: Andris Nelsons Inaugural Concert
 Driving Miss Daisy (July 17, 2015)
 Dudamel Conducts a John Williams Celebration With the LA Phil
 Vienna Philharmonic Summer Night Concert 2015

Season 43 (2015–16) 

 Billy Elliot the Musical Live
 Chita Rivera: A Lot of Livin' to Do
 Andrea Bocelli: Cinema
 From Vienna: The New Year's Celebration 2016 hosted by Julie Andrews (January 1, 2016)
 Joan Baez 75th Birthday Celebration
 Vienna Philharmonic Summer Night Concert 2016

Season 44 (2016–17) 

 Grammy Salute to Music Legends (October 14, 2016)
 Hamilton's America with Lin-Manuel Miranda (October 21, 2016)
 Gypsy (November 11, 2016)
 The Hollow Crown: Henry VI, Part I (December 16, 2016)
 The Hollow Crown: Henry VI, Part II (December 18, 2016)
 The Hollow Crown: Richard III (December 25, 2016)
 From Vienna: The New Year's Celebration 2017 hosted by Julie Andrews (January 1, 2017)
 Bel Canto the Opera (January 13, 2017)
 Alicia Keys – Landmarks Live in Concert: A Great Performances Special
 Brad Paisley – Landmarks Live in Concert: A Great Performances Special
 New York City Ballet in Paris (February 17, 2017)
 New York City Ballet Symphony in C (February 24, 2017)
 Dudamel Conducts Tangos Under the Stars with the LA Phil (March 30, 2017)
 Young Men, a ballet by BalletBoyz
 GP at the Met: Romeo et Juliette (April 13, 2017)
 GP at the Met: Nabucco (May 7, 2017)
 GP at the Met: Rusalka (June 18, 2017)
 Andrea Bocelli – Landmarks Live in Concert (June 30, 2017)
 Vienna Philharmonic Summer Night Concert 2017

Season 45 (2017–18) 

 Havana Time Machine (October 6, 2017)
 Grammy Music Legends 2017 (October 13, 2017)
 She Loves Me (October 20, 2017)
 Noël Coward's Present Laughter (November 3, 2017)
 Foo Fighters Landmarks Live in Concert: A Great Performances Special (November 10, 2017)
 Indecent (November 17, 2017)
 Irving Berlin's Holiday Inn (November 24, 2017)
 The Moody Blues: Days of Future Passed Live (November 25, 2017)
 From Vienna: The New Year's Celebration 2018 hosted by Hugh Bonneville (January 1, 2018)
 GP at the Met: Norma (January 26, 2018)
 Nas Live from the Kennedy Center: Classical Hip Hop (February 2, 2018)
 Movies For Grownups Awards with AARP the Magazine (February 23, 2018)
 GP at the Met: The Exterminating Angel (March 25, 2018)
 Will.i.am and Friends featuring the Black Eyed Peas– Landmarks Live in Concert: A Great Performances Special (April 20, 2018)
 GP at the Met: L'Elisir D'Amore (April 29, 2018)
 The Opera House
 GP at the Met: Tosca
 Ellis Island: The Dream of America with Pacific Symphony
 GP at the Met: Semiramide
 GP at the Met: Così fan tutte
 The Chris Botti Band in Concert
 Chicago Voices
 GP at the Met: Luisa Miller
 Vienna Philharmonic Summer Night Concert 2018
 GP at the Met: Cendrillon

Season 46 (2018–19) 

 Grammy Salute to Music Legends 2018 (October 5, 2018)
 An American in Paris The Musical
 John Leguizamo's Road to Broadway
 The Sound of Music Live (November 9, 2018)
 Michael Bublé: Tour Stop 148
 Harold Prince: The Director's Life
 Tony Bennett & Diana Krall: Love is Here to Stay
 k.d. lang – Landmarks Live in Concert: A Great Performances Special
 Leonard Bernstein Centennial Celebration at Tanglewood
 From Vienna: The New Year's Celebration 2019 hosted by Hugh Bonneville (January 1, 2019)
 The Cleveland Orchestra Centennial Celebration
 Orphée et Eurydice From Lyric Opera of Chicago
 Movies for Grownups Awards 2019 With AARP the Magazine
 Doubt From Minnesota Opera
 Great Performances at the Met: Marnie
 Julius Caesar from Donmar
 Andrea Bocelli @ 60
 Joni 75: A Birthday Celebration
 Birgit Nilsson: A League of Her Own
 Great Performances at the Met: Samson Et Dalila
 Great Performances at the Met: La Traviata
 Vienna Philharmonic Summer Night Concert 2019 (August 9, 2018)

Season 47 (2019–2020) 

 Now Hear This "Vivaldi: Something Completely Different" (September 20, 2019)
 Now Hear This "The Riddle of the Bach" (September 27, 2019)
 Now Hear This "Scarlatti: Man Out of Time" (October 4, 2019)
 Now Hear This "Handel: Italian Style" (October 11, 2019)
 GRAMMY Salute to Music Legends (October 18, 2019)
 Broadway's Best: 42nd Street (November 1, 2019)
 Broadway's Best: Rodger & Hammerstein's The King and I (November 8, 2019)
 Broadway's Best: Red (November 15, 2019)
 Broadway's Best: Much Ado About Nothing (November 22, 2019)
 Broadway's Best: Kinky Boots (November 29, 2019)
 Broadway's Best: Jesus Christ Superstar Live in Concert (November 30, 2019)
 An Intimate Evening with David Foster (November 30, 2019)
 From Vienna; The New Year's Celebration 2020 hosted by Hugh Bonneville (January 1, 2020)
 Great Performances at the Met: Manon (January 5, 2020)
 Movies for Grownup Awards with AARP The Magazine 2020 (January 19, 2020)
 Great Performances at the Met: Madama Butterfly (February 2, 2020)
 Great Performances at the Met: Turandot (March 20, 2020)
 Great Performances at the Met: Akhnaten (April 5, 2020)
 Andrea Bocelli: Music for Hope (April 14, 2020)
 Great Performances at the Met: Wozzeck (May 3, 2020)
 LA Phil 100 (May 8, 2020)
 Chicago Symphony Orchestra: Leonard Bernstein's 'Mass' (May 15, 2020)
 Great Performances at the Met: Agrippina (June 7, 2020)
 Ann (June 19, 2020)
 Gloria: A Life (June 26, 2020)
 Great Performances at the Met: Der Fliegende Holländer (July 5, 2020)
 Great Performances at the Met: The Gershwins' Porgy and Bess (July 17, 2020)
 Great Performances at the Met: Tosca (August 2, 2020)
 Great Performances at the Met: Maria Stuarda (September 6, 2020)

Season 48 (2020–21) 

 Romeo & Juliet (September 11, 2020)
 Now Hear This "Haydn: The King of Strings" (September 18, 2020)
 Now Hear This: The Schubert Generation (September 25, 2020)
 Now Hear This: Becoming Mozart (October 2, 2020)
 GRAMMY Salute to Music Legends (October 16, 2020)
 One Man, Two Guvnors (November 6, 2020)
 Fiddler: Miracle of Miracles (November 13, 2020)
Irving Berlin's Holiday Inn (November 20, 2020)
 Lea Salonga In Concert (November 27, 2020)
 From Vienna; The New Year's Celebration 2021 hosted by Hugh Bonneville (January 1, 2021)

Season 49 (2021–22) 

 Yannick -- An Artist's Journey (September 3, 2021)
 Verdi's Requiem: The Met Remembers 9/11 (September 11, 2021)
 The Red Shoes (September 17, 2021)
 Now Hear This: Beethoven's Ghost (October 29, 2021)
 A John Williams Premiere at Tanglewood (November 12, 2021)
 San Francisco Symphony Reopening Night (November 19, 2021)
 Coppelia (November 26, 2021)
 From Vienna; The New Year's Celebration 2022 hosted by Hugh Bonneville (January 1, 2022)
 Reopening: The Broadway Revival (January 18, 2022)
 Movies for Grownups Awards With AARP the Magazine (March 18, 2022)
 The Conductor (March 25, 2022)
 Now Hear This: Amy Beach Rise to Prominence (April 8, 2022)
 Early Days (April 15, 2022)
 Rubinstein (April 22, 2022)
 Sarah (April 29, 2022)
 Now Hear This: Aaron Copland/ Dean of American Music (April 22, 2022)
 Keeping Company with Sondheim (May 27, 2022)

Season 50 (2022–23) 
 From Vienna; The New Year's Celebration 2023 hosted by Hugh Bonneville (January 1, 2023)

References 

Lists of American television series episodes
Lists of anthology television series episodes
Incomplete television lists